Marina di Castagneto Carducci is a village in Tuscany, central Italy, administratively a frazione of the comune of Castagneto Carducci, province of Livorno. At the time of the 2011 census its population was 95.

The village is about 50 km from Livorno and 7 km from Castagneto Carducci.

The amusement park Cavallino Matto is located in Marina di Castagneto Carducci.

Main sights 
 Fort of Marina di Castagneto (18th century)

Bibliography 
 

Frazioni of the Province of Livorno